Merge in Takapuna is a proposed mixed-use development / residential skyscraper proposed for Takapuna, Auckland, New Zealand. At about 100 metres, it would become the second tallest building in Takapuna, next to the Sentinel tower already built directly adjacent to the future site.

Information

The building is to 'merge' a wide number of uses, including a high-rise residential tower of approximately 30 stories containing around 110 apartments, a lower office section with four very large levels providing 360 degree city and harbour views, which sits atop a multi-level public car park for 750 cars, which the developer will build for North Shore City Council. The ground level of the building is to contain shops and restaurants and in turn sits atop another four levels of basement car park.

The public car park, which is a central element of the Council's plan for the future parking strategy for Takapuna, will cost around NZ$30 million, offset partly by the NZ$12.5 million that the developer will pay for the site (previously the 'Gasometer') at the corner of Auburn Street and Huron Street  The whole development is to cost approximately 200 million.

After being stalled for some years by the Global Financial Crisis, the project proceeded to recourse consent stage in mid-2010. In late 2010, consent was granted. The developers expressed hope that construction could start in 2011, though skeptics consider the current financial/development market as unfavorable.

References

External links
Merge in Takapuna (lease information)

Buildings and structures in Auckland
Skyscrapers in Auckland
North Shore, New Zealand
Proposed buildings and structures in New Zealand